The Hardscrabble Open, also known as the Hardscrabble Women's Invitation, was a golf tournament played at the Hardscrabble Golf Club in Fort Smith, Arkansas, from 1945 to 1953. It was an official LPGA Tour event from 1948 to 1950.

Winners
1953 Bettye Danoff
1952 Betty Jameson
1951 Mary Lena Faulk
1950 Patty Berg
1949 Patty Berg
1948 Patty Berg
1947 Babe Zaharias
1946 Betty Jameson
1945 Margaret Gunther

References

Former LPGA Tour events
Golf in Arkansas
History of women in Arkansas